St Andrew’s Church, Twyford is a Grade I listed parish church in the Church of England in Twyford, Derbyshire.

History

The church dates from the 12th century. It was restored early in the 18th century, and the tower was repaired in 1821 following a lightning strike. There was a fire on 27 November 1910 which destroyed the organ and many of the pews. It resulted in a restoration the following year.

Parish status
The church is in a joint parish with 
All Saints’ Church, Aston-upon-Trent
St Wilfrid's Church, Barrow-upon-Trent
St Bartholomew’s Church, Elvaston
St James’ Church, Swarkestone
St James Church, Shardlow
St Mary the Virgin’s Church, Weston-on-Trent

Memorials
The church contains memorials to:
George Harpur (d. 1658)
Anna Harpur (d. 1688)

Organ

A specification of the organ can be found on the National Pipe Organ Register.

See also
Grade I listed churches in Derbyshire
Grade I listed buildings in Derbyshire
Listed buildings in Twyford and Stenson

References

Church of England church buildings in Derbyshire
Grade I listed churches in Derbyshire